Sir Tumu Te Heuheu Tūkino VIII  (born ) is a New Zealand Māori tribal leader. He is the eighth elected Paramount Chief of the Ngāti Tūwharetoa iwi in the central North Island, and an influential figure among Māori people throughout New Zealand.

Biography
Te Heuheu is the Chair of the New Zealand Historic Places Trust's Maori Heritage Council, a patron of the Tukia Group Board, has been the Chair of the UNESCO World Heritage Committee, has been the Chairman of the Tüwharetoa Trust Board and Chairman of the Lake Taupo and Lake Rotoaira Forest Trusts, and is a patron of the University of Auckland's Polynesian Society. He is a supporter of the Māori Excellence in Farming Awards.

Te Heuheu was born in 1942 or 1943, and attended St Patrick's College, Silverstream.

He is the son of Sir Hepi Te Heuheu Tukino VII, the previous elected chief. He is married to Lady Susan Te Heuheu: the couple lives in Taupo.

Honours
In the 2005 New Year Honours, Te Heuheu was appointed a Distinguished Companion of the New Zealand Order of Merit, for services to conservation. Following the restoration of titular honours by the New Zealand government in 2009, he accepted redesignation as a Knight Companion of the New Zealand Order of Merit.

References

1940s births
Living people
Knights Companion of the New Zealand Order of Merit
Ngāti Tūwharetoa people
People educated at St. Patrick's College, Silverstream
Te Heuheu family